Myles-Dalton Harrop is a professional rugby league footballer who plays as a er for the Swinton Lions in the Betfred Championship.

In September 2022 Harrop made his Salford debut in the Super League against the Warrington Wolves.

References

External links
Salford Red Devils profile

1998 births
Living people
English rugby league players
Rugby league wingers
Salford Red Devils players
Swinton Lions players